NGC 5084 is a lenticular galaxy in the constellation of Virgo. It is located at a distance of circa 80 million light years from Earth, which, given its apparent dimensions, means that NGC 5084 is at least 200,000 light years across. It is one of the largest and most massive galaxies in the Virgo Supercluster. It was discovered by William Herschel on March 10, 1785. It is a member of the NGC 5084 Group of galaxies, which is a member of the Virgo II Groups, a series of galaxies and galaxy clusters strung out from the southern edge of the Virgo Supercluster. The galaxy is seen nearly edge-on, with inclination 86°, and features a warped disk and large quantities of HI gas extending along the disk, probably accumulated after multiple accretions of smaller galaxies.

Mass and size estimates 
NGC 5084 is a very massive system, with a high rotational speed of about 328 km/s. It is categorised as a supermassive disk galaxy. Gottesen (1986) estimated based on the rotational speed that the mass of NGC 5084 is 8.5 x1011  and its radius to be 34 kpc (110 kly) for an estimated distance of 15.5 Mpc (50 Mly). Gottesman et al. (2002) using the same method adopted as distance the 30 Mpc and calculated the mass of NGC 5084 to be 1.7 x 1012 . Koribalski et al. (2004) measured the rotational speed of NGC 5084 to be 334 km/s and calculated its mass to be 1.3 × 1012 and its radius was estimated at 50 kpc (163 Kly). Carrignan et al. (1997) measured the velocity differences and projected separations of nine galaxies they identified as satellites of NGC 5084 and using different equations they estimated the mass of NGC 5084 to be between 6 x 1012  and 1 x 1013 , which was at that time the highest mass ever derived for a disk galaxy. They estimated the optical diameter of NGC 5084 to be 74 kpc (241 Kly).

Nearby galaxies 
NGC 5084 is the largest galaxy in the NGC 5084 group, which also includes NGC 5087 and NGC 5134 and some smaller galaxies. The galaxy group is compact, showing little redshift dispersion. NGC 5068 is a foreground galaxy. Other nearby galaxy groups include the NGC 5078 group, which includes NGC 5078, NGC 5061, and NGC 5101, and NGC 4965 group. NGC 5084 is located at end of Virgo II groups, a filament of galaxy groups that extents southwards from the Virgo cluster.

See also 
 NGC 1961 - a supermassive spiral galaxy
 UGC 12591 - a supermassive lenticular/spiral galaxy

Gallery

References

External links 

Lenticular galaxies
Virgo Supercluster
Virgo (constellation)
Discoveries by William Herschel
5084
46525